The 2016–17 Triobet Baltic Basketball League is the 13th season of the Baltic Basketball League and the second under the title sponsorship of Triobet. The season began on 11 October 2016 and concluded on 6 April 2017. Vytautas defeated Pieno žvaigždės in the finals to win their first Baltic Basketball League title.

Overview
This season’s competition includes 7 teams from Estonia, 6 teams from Latvia,  3 teams from Lithuania and one team from Kazakhstan and Belarus, which will play all their games away. For the regular season the teams were divided into two groups of seven teams and competed in a round-robin competition system, with team facing each of their opponents twice. The teams qualified for the eighth-finals based on their ranking after the regular season. Twelve clubs from the regular season advanced to play-offs and will be joined by three Estonian and one Lithuanian club, all of whom have been knocked out of other European competitions. The four clubs joining directly in the play-offs will be University of Tartu, Vytautas, Kalev/Cramo and TLÜ/Kalev, all seeded respectively 1-through-4, based on their accomplishments and combined results of the past three seasons in domestic leagues and Triobet BBL. All play-off games are played in home-and-away series.

Teams

Team information

Regular season

In each group, teams played against each other home-and-away in a round-robin format. The six first qualified teams advanced to the Play-offs, while the last teams were eliminated. The regular season began on 11 October 2016 and concluded on 25 January 2017. Rakvere Tarvas/Palmse Metall were disqualified from the Playoffs after forfeiting the regular season away match against Jēkabpils on 25 January 2017 with Barsy Atyrau advancing instead.

Group A

Group B

Playoffs

Bracket

Awards

MVP of the Week
MVP of the Week award is given to the best individual performance on a winning team based on their efficiency rating.
Regular season

Playoffs

MVP of the Month
{| class="wikitable" style="text-align: center;"
! align="center"|Month
! align="center" width=200|Player
! align="center" width=200|Team
! align="center" width=|Ref.
|-
|October 2016||align="left"| Mārtiņš Laksa ||align="left"| Valmiera/ORDO || 
|-
|November 2016||align="left"| Thomas van der Mars ||align="left"| AVIS Rapla || 
|-
|December 2016||align="left"| Edgars Jeromanovs ||align="left"| Jūrmala/Fēnikss ||  
|-
|January 2017||align="left"| Denis Krestinin ||align="left"| Barons kvartāls ||

Finals MVP
 Tomas Delininkaitis ( Vytautas)

Player statistics
Players qualify to this category by having at least 50% games played.

Points

Assists

Rebounds

Efficiency

References

External links
 Official website

Baltic Basketball League seasons
2016–17 in European basketball leagues
2016–17 in Lithuanian basketball
2016–17 in Estonian basketball
2016–17 in Latvian basketball
2016–17 in Belarusian basketball
2016–17 in Kazakhstani basketball